Nike Doggart is a conservationist, environmental activist, and writer.

Doggart has an MA and a MSc, and was educated at Christ Church, Oxford and at University College, London. She began her career as a marine conservationist in Belize. Her research work in the forests of Tanzania has yielded the discovery of various new species, including a frog from the Eastern Arc Mountains which is named after her, Arthroleptis nikeae.

Doggart is an advisor to the Tanzania Forest Conservation Group. She has successfully lobbied the Tanzanian government to conserve water and forestry resources, and to promote environmentally sustainable forms of economic development. One of the most innovative and successful programs that she has promoted is the introduction of sustainable butterfly farming for women living adjacent to the Amani Nature Reserve.

Doggart was a presenter and advisor on the BBC's Villages on the Front Line, broadcast in 2006. She is the Editor of The Arc Journal. She has two children, Amani and Olivia.

Gallery

References

External links 
 Nike Doggart profile on Research Gate

Tanzanian non-fiction writers
Year of birth missing (living people)
Living people
British environmentalists
Women environmentalists
Alumni of Christ Church, Oxford
Alumni of University College London
21st-century British non-fiction writers
British magazine editors
Women magazine editors